Willow Branch is an unincorporated community in Brown Township, Hancock County, Indiana.

History
The first store in Willow Branch was established in 1874. The community took its name from the stream upon which it is located, the Willow Branch creek.

Willow Branch was platted as a town in 1882.

Geography
Willow Branch is a populated place located in Hancock County at latitude 39.876 and longitude -85.684.

The elevation is 935 feet. Willow Branch appears on the Pendleton U.S. Geological Survey Map. Hancock County is in the Eastern Time Zone (UTC -5 hours)

References

Unincorporated communities in Hancock County, Indiana
Unincorporated communities in Indiana
Indianapolis metropolitan area